The 2008 WSBL season was the 20th season of the Women's State Basketball League (SBL). The regular season began on Friday 28 March and ended on Saturday 2 August. The finals began on Friday 8 August and ended on Friday 5 September, when the Perry Lakes Hawks defeated the Willetton Tigers in the WSBL Grand Final.

Regular season
The regular season began on Friday 28 March and ended on Saturday 2 August after 19 rounds of competition.

Standings

Finals
The finals began on Friday 8 August and ended on Friday 5 September with the WSBL Grand Final.

Bracket

Awards

Statistics leaders

Regular season
 Most Valuable Player: Deanna Smith (Perry Lakes Hawks)
 Coach of the Year: Robyn Winter (Willetton Tigers) & Gary McKay (Cockburn Cougars)
 Most Improved Player: Natalie Burton (Perry Lakes Hawks)
 All Star First Team:
 Tanya Kelly (Perry Lakes Hawks)
 Deanna Smith (Perry Lakes Hawks)
 Rebecca Duke (Willetton Tigers)
 Carly Wilson (Stirling Senators)
 Eleanor Haring (Stirling Senators)
 All Star Second Team:
 Samantha Richards (Mandurah Magic)
 Rebecca Mercer (Kalamunda Eastern Suns)
 Teagan Walker (Geraldton Buccaneers)
 Brooke Hiddlestone (Perth Redbacks)
 Natalie Burton (Perry Lakes Hawks)
 All Star Third Team:
 Kate Malpass (Willetton Tigers)
 Melissa Marsh (Willetton Tigers)
 Liz Cooke (Stirling Senators)
 Ashley Gilmore (Lakeside Lightning)
 Dana Jones (Geraldton Buccaneers)

Finals
 Grand Final MVP: Deanna Smith (Perry Lakes Hawks)

References

External links
 2008 SBL season at sbl.asn.au
 2008 fixtures
 July 2008 review
 2008 grand final preview

2008
2007–08 in Australian basketball
2008–09 in Australian basketball